Lindsley Register is an American actress, producer and writer. She is best known for her role as Laura on The Walking Dead, and as Dharma on Six. She has also appeared in an episode of House of Cards.

Early life and education 
Register was born and raised in Blue Ridge Mountains of Virginia, United States. She was brought up with two older brothers and a younger sister. She went to Liberty University, and it was not until Register ditched a major in Teaching English as a Second Language during college that she started to take acting seriously. Register had a very traditional conservative Baptist upbringing. During college, Register started acting in plays, and this made her fall in love with acting; she realized this was something she wanted to pursue. Acting really broadened her views and mindset; it made her think from a different perspective, rather than her own which she was brought up with her entire life. Having a mentor figure really helped her with this change. She eventually graduated with a double major in Theater performance and Theater Education, and it did not take very long for her to get going in the industry. Within her first year, she got an agent and secured roles on multiple shows and films.

Career 
During her first year after graduating from college, Register received a costarring role in episode 404 of House of Cards, portraying one of the protesters opposite to Kevin Spacey. This would help her get several more roles in indie films and other notable shows, such as The Haves and the Have Nots, where she plays as Karen, and Outcast. Her first series regular role came in the new History channel series Six. Most recently, she has become well known for her role as Laura in The Walking Dead. Register joined The Walking Dead cast during season 7 of the show, and has been a part of the show ever since. In a YouTube video posted during the production of season 8, Register revealed how being called up to The Walking Dead was one of the most terrifying, yet exciting challenges and moments in her career. In that video, she explained how huge the step up was with the massive production set, especially with the character of Laura in her words "a stretch from who I am naturally". However, none of this would harm her performance. On November 14, 2018, Register announced on her Facebook page that she was part of the movie Scorn, which is set to be released later this year. In addition to Register's acting career, Register is also a producer and writer, working as the writer and executive producer for the short films Morsus and Ave Maria. She is also the executive producer of the movie Scorn, in which she is also one of the main cast.

Filmography

References 

21st-century American actresses
American film actresses
American women film producers
American women screenwriters
Living people
Year of birth missing (living people)
Actresses from Virginia
Screenwriters from Virginia
Liberty University alumni
American television actresses